Jacek Kiełb (born 10 January 1988 in Siedlce) is a Polish professional footballer who plays as a midfielder for Korona Kielce.

Career

Club
Kiełb began his career 2004 with Pogoń Siedlce and joined 2005 in the youth team of Korona Kielce, who made one year later his professional debut in the Ekstraklasa.

On 10 June 2010 Lech Poznań signed the 22-year-old Polish midfielder from Korona Kielce. In August 2011, he was loaned to Korona Kielce on a one-year deal.

Career statistics

Club

1 All appearances in Ekstraklasa Cup.

References

External links
 
 
 Jacek Kiełb at Footballdatabase

1988 births
Living people
People from Siedlce
Sportspeople from Masovian Voivodeship
Association football midfielders
Polish footballers
Poland international footballers
Poland youth international footballers
Poland under-21 international footballers
MKP Pogoń Siedlce players
Korona Kielce players
Lech Poznań players
Polonia Warsaw players
Śląsk Wrocław players
Bruk-Bet Termalica Nieciecza players
Ekstraklasa players
I liga players